"Holy Grail" is a song performed by the Australian band Hunters & Collectors on their 1992 album Cut. With lyrics referring to popular Holy Grail mythology, the song is an anthemic single inspired by Napoleon's march to Russia in 1812, but also referencing the Hunters and Collectors' flagging attempts to "crack" the American market.

Singer Mark Seymour said, "With the lyrics, I'd been reading a Jeanette Winterson novel, "The Passion". It was a story about Napoleon's chef when he invaded Russia. The army was destroyed by the weather. It's a story about survival. It's a really powerful book and somehow I drew this analogy between the idea of this guy managing to survive this incredible ordeal and Hunters and Collectors making this excruciating record."

The song has since become an Australian rules football anthem, particularly with the reference to the Premiership Cup and the AFL Grand Final. Channel Ten used the song to open and close its AFL broadcasts between 2002 and 2006. Seymour performed the song as part of the AFL Grand Final's pre-match entertainment in 1998, 2002 and 2009 and half-time entertainment in 2013. This song was used for many years as the theme song of the Queensland Bulls cricket team in the quest for the Sheffield Shield, its own "Holy Grail". It was also featured as the theme song to the Australian rugby league movie Footy Legends.

In 2013 a cover version of "Holy Grail" by The Rubens appeared on the tribute album, Crucible – The Songs of Hunters & Collectors.

In January 2018, as part of Triple M's "Ozzest 100", the 'most Australian' songs of all time, "Holy Grail" was ranked number 30.

Track listing

Personnel 
Credited to:
Hunters & Collectors members
 John Archer – bass guitar
 Doug Falconer – drums
 John 'Jack' Howard – trumpet
 Robert Miles – live sound, art director
 Barry Palmer - lead guitar
 Mark Seymour – vocals, guitar
 Jeremy Smith – French horn
 Michael Waters – trombone, keyboards

Recording details
 Producer – Don Gehman ("Holy Grail")
 Associate Producer/mixing – Rick Will ("Holy Grail")
 Assistant mixing – Lori Fumer ("Holy Grail")
 Engineer/recording – Gary Cranston (tracks 2-5)
 Remixing – Tony Espie
 Studios – Festival Studios, Sydney (recording); The Grey Room; Larabee Studios, Los Angeles (mixing) ("Holy Grail")
 MMM Studios, Melbourne (recording/engineering); Platinum Studios, Melbourne (remixing) (tracks 2-5)

Charts

References

External links
 "Holy Grail" video

1993 songs
Australian rules football songs
Hunters & Collectors songs
Song recordings produced by Don Gehman
Songs written by Mark Seymour
Sports television theme songs
Mushroom Records singles